To recognise excellence in professional dance in the United Kingdom, The Critics' Circle organised and presented the National Dance Awards 2005.  The ceremony was held at the Royal Opera House, London, on 19 January 2006, with awards given for productions staged in the previous year.

Awards Presented
 De Valois Award for Outstanding Achievement in Dance - Monica Mason, Artistic Director of The Royal Ballet
 Best Male Dancer - Thomas Lund, of the Royal Danish Ballet
 Best Female Dancer - Marianela Nuñez, of The Royal Ballet
 Working Title Billy Elliot Prize - Kristopher Spencer
 Audience Award - Northern Ballet Theatre and Motionhouse Dance Theatre
 Dance UK Industry Award - Brendan Keaney' Best Choreography (Classical) - Sir Frederick Ashton, for Sylvia for The Royal Ballet (Restaged by Christopher Newton)
 Best Choreography (Modern) - Russell Maliphant, for Broken Fall'' for George Piper Dances and The Royal Ballet
 Best Choreography (Musical Theatre) - Peter Darling, for Billy Elliot the Musical at the Victoria Palace Theatre
 Outstanding Male or Female Artist (Modern) - Akram Khan, for performances with his own company
 Outstanding Male or Female Artist (Classical) - Rupert Pennefather, of The Royal Ballet
 Company Prize for Outstanding Repertoire (Classical) - The Royal Ballet
 Company Prize for Outstanding Repertoire (Modern) - Rambert Dance Company
 Best Foreign Dance Company - Australian Ballet from Australia

Special awards
No special awards were presented for the 2005 season.

References

National Dance Awards
Dance
Dance